Blue Hearts is an album by the American alternative rock musician Bob Mould, released in 2020. Mould considered the tracks to be protest songs.

The album peaked at No. 181 on the Billboard 200.

Production
Mould was joined on the album by drummer Jon Wurster and bassist Jason Narducy. Thirteen of Blue Hearts 14 tracks are less than three minutes in length. Produced by Mould, it was recorded at Electrical Audio, in Chicago.

Critical reception

The New Yorker concluded that Mould "calls forth his hardest and most focussed music in years ... These tuneful guitar blitzkriegs have plenty of room for playfulness alongside the bile." Rolling Stone wrote that "what makes it jaw-dropping is the precision with which Mould has focused his ire on conservatives, evangelicals, homophobes, while leaving room for some self-criticism as well."

The Morning Call thought that the "blunt lyrics are matched by a furious musical assault." The Winnipeg Free Press determined that "Narducy and Wurster ... are lifers and whose relentless rock ‘n’ roll groove is the perfect complement to Mould’s spiky melodicism." The Sunday Times opined that the album "represents a howl of anger, its muddy production heightening the sense of gloom and claustrophobia."

AllMusic deemed the album "a fast, furious, passionate broadside," writing that "the sound of Blue Hearts bears a certain resemblance to the music Mould made with Hüsker Dü in its physical power and lack of emotional compromise."

Track listing

Personnel
 Bob Mould – lead vocals, guitar, keyboards, percussion
 Jason Narducy – bass, backing vocals
 Jon Wurster – drums, percussionAdditional musicians Prague TV Orchestra – strings on "American Crisis"
 Alison Chesley; Paul Martens – orchestral score transcriptionsProduction'
 Bob Mould – producer
 Beau Sorenson – engineer
 Matthew Barnhart – mastering
 Daniel Murphy – art design
 Blake Little – photography

References

2020 albums
Bob Mould albums
Merge Records albums